Arnold S. Caplin (May 8, 1929 in Brooklyn, New York City – December 25, 2009 in Pittsfield, Massachusetts) was an American record producer, founder and (former) owner of Historical Records and Biograph Records. In 1970 he additionally acquired Melodeon Records from Richard K. Spottswood.

See also
 Nitty Gritty Dirt Band
 Thomasina Winslow

References

External links
 Biograph Records official website
 Illustrated Biograph Records discography
 Illustrated Historical Records discography
 Illustrated Melodeon Records discography

1929 births
2009 deaths
Record producers from New York (state)